Meadowbank can refer to:

Australia
 Meadowbank, New South Wales

Canada
 Meadowbank, Prince Edward Island, a community in Prince Edward Island
 Meadowbank Aerodrome, Nunavut
 Meadowbank Gold Mine, Nunavut

England
 Meadowbank, Cheshire, a location in North West England

New Zealand
 Meadowbank, New Zealand, a suburb of Auckland

Scotland
 Meadowbank, Edinburgh
 Meadowbank Stadium, Edinburgh
 Old Meadowbank, a now-demolished stadium in Edinburgh
 New Meadowbank, a now-demolished stadium in Edinburgh
 Meadowbank Thistle F.C., a Scottish football club that existed from 1974 to 1995